The University of St. Augustine for Health Sciences (USAHS) is a private for-profit health sciences university headquartered in San Marcos, California. It was founded in 1979 as the Institute of Physical Therapy. It has campuses in San Marcos and in St. Augustine, Florida; Miami, Florida; Austin, Texas; and Dallas, Texas.  The university is owned by the private equity firm Altas Partners.

History 
The school that ultimately became the University of St. Augustine for Health Sciences was founded in Atlanta, Georgia, in 1979 by Stanley V. Paris as the Institute of Physical Therapy. Paris retired from USAHS in 2007.
 
In 1997, the school officially became "The University of St. Augustine for Health Sciences." It purchased a small private hospital and an adjoining 26 acres of land at the Flagler Health Park Campus in St. Augustine, creating its current St. Augustine campus.

In 2007, USAHS expanded to California, opening a campus in San Diego.  The university also completed work on a 98,000-square-foot academic and clinic building at the St. Augustine campus. Two years later, the San Diego campus moved to San Marcos, California.  

In 2012, the University opened a third campus in Austin, Texas. The following year, Laureate International Universities acquired a majority interest in USAHS.

In 2015, USAHS opened its fourth campus in Miami, Florida.

Altas Partners, a Canadian long-term private equity firm, purchased USAHS from Laureate in 2019. Shortly thereafter, USAHS opened its fifth location in Dallas, Texas.

Academics 
USAHS offers the following degree programs of study: 

College of Rehabilitative Sciences
 Doctor of Occupational Therapy
 Master of Occupational Therapy
 Post-Professional Doctor of Occupational Therapy
 Doctor of Physical Therapy
 Master of Science in Speech-Language Pathology

 College of Health Sciences

 School of Nursing
 Doctor of Nursing Practice
 Master of Science in Nursing

Other Health Sciences
 Doctor of Education
 Master of Health Administration
 
USAHS is accredited by the WASC Senior College and University Commission.

In 2017, USAHS opened its first Center for Innovative Clinical Practice on the San Marcos campus.

Notable faculty 
USAHS founder Stanley V. Paris was the first president of the Orthopaedic Section of the American Physical Therapy Association (APTA). 

Faculty member Todd Bourgeois is a three-time national qualifying contestant on the NBC show American Ninja Warrior. Nicknamed the “Cajun Cowboy,” Bourgeois has been competing on the show since 2013.

References

External links
 Official website

University of St. Augustine
Universities and colleges in the Jacksonville metropolitan area
Boca Raton, Florida
Universities and colleges in San Diego County, California
Education in San Marcos, California
Education in Austin, Texas